JAMA is a peer-reviewed medical journal published by the American Medical Association

Jama or JAMA may also refer to:

Places 
 Jama (woreda), Amhara Region, Ethiopia
 Jama, Dumka, Jharkhand state, India
 Jama, Dumka (village)
 Jama (Vidhan Sabha constituency)
 Jama Canton
 Jama, Ecuador
 Jama River
 Jama, Iran
 Jama, Kranj, Slovenia
 Jama, Novo Mesto, Slovenia
 Djamaa, or Jama'a, Algeria
 Paso de Jama, a mountain pass between Argentina and Chile
 Kingisepp, formerly Jama, in the Leningrad Oblast, Russia
 Jama (Martian crater)
 Jama Formation, a geologic formation in Ecuador

Other uses
 Jama (coat), a garment of South Asia
 Jama (name), a common Somali male name, including a list of people with the name
 JAMA (numerical linear algebra library), a software library
 Jama Software, a software company 
 JAMA (political party), a former Iranian political party
 Japan Automobile Manufacturers Association, a trade association
 Journal of Asian Martial Arts, a martial arts journal

See also 

 Jama masjid, a type of mosque 
 Japan Amusement Machine and Marketing Association (JAMMA)